Elachista bruuni is a moth of the family Elachistidae. It is found in Finland, Russia, Estonia and Latvia.

Adults are on wing in June and July.

References

bruuni
Moths described in 1990
Moths of Europe